Pte. John Condon (5 October 1900 – 24 May 1915) was an Irish soldier born in Waterford. He was believed to have been the youngest Allied soldier killed during the First World War, at the age of 14 years; he lied about his age and he claimed to be 18 years old when he signed up to join the army in 1913. He was killed in action in a gas attack during the Second Battle of Ypres in 1915 and his body was not recovered for another ten years; his family were unaware that Condon was in Belgium until they were contacted by the British Army and told that he was missing in action. In 1922, Condon was also posthumously awarded the British War Medal, the Victory Medal and the 1914-15 Star.

It is now believed from a birth certificate, census, war diaries and other records that John Condon would have been 18 years old at the recorded date of his death and that the wrong individual is named on the grave.  At the present time, the headstone in Poelkapelle Cemetery and the CWGC record continue to assert the challenged data.

In popular culture
Condon is the subject of the song of the same name by Mary Dillon, released in 2013 as a single from her debut album North.

Gallery

References

Further reading
 Condon evidence

1900 births
1915 deaths
People from Waterford (city)
Royal Irish Regiment (1684–1922) soldiers
British Army personnel of World War I
British military personnel killed in World War I
Child soldiers in World War I